Salvador Yaméogo is a politician who held the position of Minister of Transportation and Tourism in the government of Burkina Faso.

References

Living people
Year of birth missing (living people)
Transport ministers of Burkina Faso
Place of birth missing (living people)
21st-century Burkinabé people